Does Humor Belong in Music? is a one-hour Frank Zappa concert video composed of live performances at The Pier in New York City (August 26, 1984) along with a few interview segments. It was released on VHS by MPI Home Video in 1985 and reissued on DVD in 2003 by EMI. The video has no recorded material in common with the album of the same name, but some of the tracks were released (in whole or in part) on Volumes One, Three and Six of the You Can't Do That on Stage Anymore series.

A laserdisc version was also released in Japan, complete with Japanese subtitles for all spoken and sung material and featuring a slightly different audio mix than the VHS and DVD versions. This laserdisc version was available as a bootleg DVD from both the "Digital Underground" label (no association with the rap group of the same name) and the "Room 101" bootleg label, released a year or so before the official EMI DVD.

Track listing
"Zoot Allures"
"Tinsel Town Rebellion"
 City of Tiny Lites (beginning) / interview segment
"Trouble Every Day"
"Hot Plate Heaven at the Green Hotel" (edited, and including more interview segments)
 Goblin Girl (beginning) / interview segment
 The Deathless Horsie (ending)
"The Dangerous Kitchen"
"He's So Gay"
"Bobby Brown Goes Down"
"Keep It Greasy"
"Honey, Don't You Want a Man Like Me?"
 Carol, You Fool (beginning) / interview segment
"Dinah-Moe Humm"
"Cosmik Debris"
(Encore)
"Be in My Video"
"Dancin' Fool"
"Whippin' Post"

Personnel
Frank Zappa -  guitar, vocals 
Ray White -  guitar, vocals 
Ike Willis -  guitar, vocals, duck call and other effects
Bobby Martin -  vocals, keyboards, French horn, sax 
Allan Zavod -  keyboards 
Scott Thunes -  Bass 
Chad Wackerman - drums

External links
 
 Information Is Not Knowledge

1985 films
1985 video albums
Films directed by Frank Zappa
Films scored by Frank Zappa
Stand-up comedy concert films
Concert films
1985 comedy films
Films set in 1984
Films shot in New York City